The barony of Mohill (historically Conmhaícne Maigh Réin) is an ancient barony in County Leitrim, Republic of Ireland.

Etymology
Mohill barony shares its name with Mohill ("soft or spongy ground") village.

Location

Mohill is found in south County Leitrim, on the Cloone River, containing Lough Rynn and bordering Lough Boderg. It is bordered to the northeast by Carrigallen; to the northwest by Leitrim (both the preceding baronies are also in County Leitrim); to the southeast by Longford, County Longford; and to the southwest by Ballintober North, County Roscommon.

History
This place was historically named Conmhaícne Maigh Réin. After the 9th century the Reynolds (MacRannall or Muintir Eolais) were chiefs of this territory.

Plague
Back in the 6th century, the Justinian plague of Mohill devastated the population of Mohill barony and parish.

Museum artefacts
The following are preserved in a collection at the  Royal Irish Academy museum in Dublin.

Breanross hanging tree

, according to tradition recorded by Irish Folklore Commission, is the stump of a hangman's tree, on which Irish rebels of 1798 were executed , is still pointed out at Breanross townland.

Cloonmorris Ogham stone

The  is the only recorded Ogham inscribed stone discovered in county Leitrim.

Oldest Irishman
A telegram reporting his death was sent to news outlets from Mohill . His father had fought under General Munro in the Irish Rebellion of 1798, and was imprisoned and martyred afterwards. Tom Coughlan compiled his unverified biography.

Natural history

Irish elk
In the 19th Century the skull of an ancient Irish elk was "found in the parish of Cloone, barony of Mohill, county of Leitrim. This head was in the possession of a labourer, who said he found it in the river, under the village of Cloone.  A very perfect, large head, measuring, from the occipital crest at top to the end of the mouth bone, 22 inches. The head is rather narrower than usual; a portion of each stem and both brow antlers are perfect. The palm of the brow antler is seven inches across ; there is some irre gularity in the crown of the left beam, as if from exuberant growth; a small tit-like projection, apparently the commencement of a third horn, springs from the bone beneath the base of the beam on this side. The colour of the whole is very dark, but both the bone and horn are in a fine state of preservation; it is heavier than any of the other specimens held by the Royal Irish Academy museum in Dublin."

List of settlements

Below is a list of settlements in Mohill barony:
Cloone
Mohill
Dromod
Roosky

Notes and references

Plague notes

Mohill notes

Citations

Irish annals

Primary sources

Secondary sources

Ecclesiastical

Oldest Irishman

Archaeological

Rebellion

External links 

Baronies of County Leitrim
Places of Conmaicne Maigh Rein
Mohill